Pope John XXIII (25 November 1881 – 3 June 1963)  and Pope John Paul II (18 May 1920 – 2 April 2005) reigned as popes of the Roman Catholic Church and the sovereigns of Vatican City (respectively from 1958 to 1963 and 1978 to 2005). Their canonizations were held on 27 April 2014. The decision to canonize was made official by Pope Francis on 5 July 2013 following the recognition of a miracle attributed to the intercession of John Paul II, while John XXIII was canonized for his merits of opening the Second Vatican Council. The date of the canonization was assigned on 30 September 2013.

The Canonization Mass was celebrated by Pope Francis (with Pope Emeritus Benedict XVI concelebrating), on 27 April 2014 (Divine Mercy Sunday), in St. Peter's Square (Pope John Paul had died on the vigil of Divine Mercy Sunday in 2005). About 150 Cardinals and 700 bishops concelebrated the Mass, and at least 500,000 people attended the Mass with an estimated 300,000 others watching from video screens placed around Rome.

People present at the canonization
Delegations from over a hundred States or international organizations were present for the canonization in Rome, including 19 heads of state and 24 heads of government.

Images

References

2014 in Italy
2014 in Christianity
2014 in Vatican City
John 23 and John Paul 2, Popes
Pope John XXIII
Pope John Paul II
Events in Vatican City
April 2014 events in Europe